Wilhelm Günther (21 April 1899 - 1945) was a German SS-Brigadeführer and Generalmajor of Police who served as an SS and Police Leader (SSPF) in the occupied Soviet Union, and as the commander of police and security forces in Trieste during Second World War. He was declared dead after the end of the war.

Early life and career 
Günther was born in Ermenrod and served as a soldier with a signals unit in the Imperial German Army during the First World War. After the end of the war, he served for a short time in the Reichswehr under the Weimar Republic until being discharged October 1919. He then studied electrical engineering. Active in the opposition to the Occupation of the Ruhr, he was briefly imprisoned for espionage activities by a French military court. 

In May 1932 Günther joined the Nazi Party (membership number 1,094,209) and on 14 March 1933, the SS (SS number 69,638). From March 1933 to April 1935 he worked as a signals specialist in SS-Abschnitt (District) XI, based in Wiesbaden. Assigned to the Sicherheitsdienst (SD), the SS intelligence service, he was posted to SS-Oberabschnitt (Main District) "Rhine," also headquartered in Wiesbaden, until April 1937. This was followed by a tour as the Commander of the SD in the Oberabschnitt "Südost" based in Breslau until November 1938. During this time he was active in the occupation of the Sudetenland. From October 1939 to March 1941 he was Inspekteur der Sicherheitspolizei und des SD (Inspector of SiPo and SD) in Stettin and then in Kassel until September 1942.

Wartime service 
In the Second World War, following the German summer offensive aimed at the Caucasus, Günther was appointed, from 7 May to 23 August 1942, to be the SS and Police Leader (SSPF) "Bergvölker-Ordshonikidse," the only holder of this short-lived command. He was then transferred to become the SSPF "Wolhynien-Luzk" in western Ukraine from 1 September 1942 until June 1944 when he was succeeded by SS-Brigadeführer Ernst Hartmann. He left the eastern front in May 1944 to serve as the Befehlshaber der Sicherheitspolizei und des SD (Commander of SiPo and SD) in Trieste, located in the Operational Zone of the Adriatic Littoral. 

In Italy, Günther reported to SS-Gruppenführer Wilhelm Harster, and his organization's chief responsibilities were combating partisan operations and carrying out anti-Jewish persecutions and deportations. Trieste was the site of the infamous Risiera di San Sabba concentration camp. Günther remained in Italy until mid-February 1945, and then served in a staff position in the Reich Security Main Office (RSHA) in Berlin until the end of the war.  

Little is known of Günther's ultimate fate, and he was declared dead after the end of the war.

Awards 
 Iron Cross (1914) 2nd class
 Wound Badge (1918) 
 Clasp to the Iron Cross 2nd Class
 Iron Cross (1939) 1st class
 War Merit Cross (1939) 1st and 2nd class with Swords

See also 
 Holocaust in Italy
 Holocaust in Ukraine

References

Sources

1899 births
1945 deaths
Date of death unknown
Holocaust perpetrators in Italy
Holocaust perpetrators in Ukraine
People from Hesse
Recipients of the clasp to the Iron Cross, 2nd class
Recipients of the Iron Cross (1939), 1st class
Recipients of the War Merit Cross
Reichswehr personnel
SS and Police Leaders
SS-Brigadeführer
Waffen-SS personnel killed in action